Molham Darreh (also Romanized as Molhamdareh, Malham Dareh, and Malham Darreh; also known as Molāmadar, Molhamdar, and Malamdar) is a village in Seyyed Jamal ol Din Rural District, in the Central District of Asadabad County, Hamadan Province, Iran. At the 2006 census, its population was 402, in 111 families.

Location
The village is located in Iran.

References 

Populated places in Asadabad County